Graham Hood (born April 2, 1972) is a retired track and field athlete from Canada, who competed in the middle distance events.

Early life
Hood was born in Winnipeg, Manitoba to parents Colin and Brenda, but grew up in Burlington, Ontario. His father served as the Executive Director of the Ontario Federation of School Athletic Associations (OFSAA) and the Colin Hood OFSAA School Sport Award is named in his honour. He has two sisters.

Hood attended Nelson High School where he was a four-time OFSAA champion in the 800m and 1500m. Hood was a member of the Burlington Track and Field Club and played a variety of sports during his high school years, including soccer, basketball, cross country skiing, and track and field.

Collegiate
Hood ran collegiately for the college track powerhouse Arkansas Razorbacks where he helped the team capture NCAA titles in cross country and both indoor and outdoor track and field. Hood was named the Top Relay Runner among college men at the 1994 Penn Relays.

Hood was inducted into the University of Arkansas Hall of Honour in 2014.

Running career
Hood represented his native country at two consecutive Summer Olympics, starting in 1992. He won the gold medal in the men's 1.500 metres race at the 1999 Pan American Games in his native Winnipeg.

Hood is the only Canadian to have won the Millrose Games' Wanamaker Mile, having won the 1995 edition of the event with a time of 3:57.08.

Hood placed 679th overall at the 2017 Ironman World Championship, October 14 in Kailua-Kona, Hawai'i, finishing with a time of 10:29:28.

Personal life
Hood is married to fellow Canadian Olympian Malindi Elmore and has two children.

Competition record

References

External links
 

1972 births
Living people
Canadian male middle-distance runners
Athletes (track and field) at the 1992 Summer Olympics
Athletes (track and field) at the 1994 Commonwealth Games
Athletes (track and field) at the 1996 Summer Olympics
Athletes (track and field) at the 1999 Pan American Games
Athletes (track and field) at the 2002 Commonwealth Games
Olympic track and field athletes of Canada
Sportspeople from Kelowna
Athletes from Winnipeg
University of Arkansas alumni
Arkansas Razorbacks men's track and field athletes
Nelson High School (Ontario) alumni
Pan American Games gold medalists for Canada
Pan American Games medalists in athletics (track and field)
Medalists at the 1999 Pan American Games
Commonwealth Games competitors for Canada